Confessions from the David Galaxy Affair (UK re-release title: Star Sex) is a 1979 British sexploitation comedy film directed by Willy Roe and starring Alan Lake, Glynn Edwards, Mary Millington, Bernie Winters, Diana Dors and Antony Booth.

It was not part of the Confessions series of films from Columbia Pictures that began in 1974 with Confessions of a Window Cleaner, but it was hoped that it would benefit commercially from the similarity of title.

Plot
A playboy astrologer has to prove an alibi to police for a robbery five years before.

Cast
 Alan Lake - David Galaxy
 Glynn Edwards - Chief Inspector Evans
 Mary Millington - Millicent Cumming
 Bernie Winters - Mr. Pringle
 Antony Booth - Steve
 Diana Dors - Jenny Stride
 Kenny Lynch - Joe
 Rosemary England - Sandra
 John Moulder-Brown - Sergeant Johnson
 Alec Mango - Pembleton
 Queenie Watts - David Galaxy's Mother
 Milton Reid - Eddie
 Sally Faulkner - Amanda
 Lindy Benson - Evelyn
 Ballard Berkeley - Judge
 Cindy Truman - Anne
 Vicki Scott - Charlotte
 Maria Parkinson - Susan MP
 George Lewis - George
 John M. East - Willie

Production
The film was financed by businessman David Sullivan to promote the career of Millington, who was his girlfriend at the time.

Music
Diana Dors performed the film's theme song over the opening titles.

Release
The film was Sullivan's first box-office flop, being released at a period when soft porn theatrical films were losing their popularity in Britain.

References

Further reading

Keeping the British End Up: Four Decades of Saucy Cinema by Simon Sheridan (fourth edition) (Titan Publishing, London) (2011)

External links

1979 films
1970s sex comedy films
1970s English-language films
British sex comedy films
1979 comedy films
1970s British films